Hoang Lien National Park (also known as Hoàng Liên Sơn, Dãy Hoàng Liên) is a national park within Hoang Lien Son Range, in the districts of Sa Pa and Than Uyên of Lào Cai Province, and part of Phong Thổ District in Lai Châu Province in Northern Vietnam.

The national park was established according to the Decision number 90/2002/QĐ-TTg  dated 12 July 2006 by the government of Vietnam. This decision turned the Nature Reserve into a National Park. Hoang Lien National Park is recognized as a part of ASEAN Heritage Parks and a Centre of Plant Diversity in the International Union for Conservation of Nature's (IUCN) Plant Conservation Program.

Location 
Hoang Lien National Park is Vietnam's mountainous Northwest and includes Fansipan, the highest mountain in Vietnam and on the Indochinese Peninsula.

The core part of Hoang Lien National Park is within San Sa Ho, Lao Chai, Ta Van, Ban Ho populated places, Sa Pa district, Lao Cai Province, and a part of Muong Khoa, Than Thuoc communes, Than Uyen district.

There are six ethnic groups living in this area, with Dao and H'mong people being the majority.

Biodiversity 
Hoang Lien National Park is home to numerous species of plants and animals, many of which are rare and endangered.

Flora and fauna 

Over 3000 plant species have been recorded in the park, including many endemic and endangered species. The mountainous terrain of the park means distinct altitudinal zonation is seen, with the flora changing from tropical plants at low elevations to temperate alpine plants at high elevations. An estimated amount of 25 percent of Vietnam's endemic plants are found on Fansipan mountain.

About one-third of amphibian species present in Vietnam can be found in the park.

Butterflies and Moths 
A total of 199 butterfly species has been observed in Hoang Lien National Park. For moths, a total of 78 species of sphingidea and a total of 286 species of noctuidae has been observed.

Mammals and Amphibians 
There are ten species of animals and four species of birds which are globally endangered were recorded in the park. The population of mammals in Hoang Lien National Park is low due to poaching.

However, in 1999, it is recorded that there are 347 bird species in and around the nature reserve, including 49 species that are restricted in Vietnam to North-west Tonkin.

A total of 38 different anuran (frogs and toads) species were observed in Hoang Lien National Park in 1997-1998.

References

See also 
 Fansipan, a mountain in the national park
 Southeast Asian Massif, a term describing the mountainous uplands

National parks of Vietnam
Protected areas established in 2006
Geography of Lào Cai province
Geography of Lai Châu province
ASEAN heritage parks